The highest-selling singles in Japan are ranked in the Oricon Weekly Chart, which is published by Oricon Style magazine. The data are compiled by Oricon based on each singles' weekly physical sales. In 2008, 49 singles reached the peak of the chart.

R&B singer Namie Amuro's "60s 70s 80s" became her first number one single in nearly 10 years. The single made Amuro the only female Japanese artist to have a Top 10 single for 14 consecutive years. Pop boy band NEWS' "Happy Birthday" made them the second group after the KinKi Kids to have 10 consecutive number one singles since their debut. "Purple Line" made Korean pop boy band TVXQ the fifth non-Japanese Asian artist and the first male group to have a number one on the charts. With the release of "Jumon: Mirotic" they became the only foreign artist to have four number ones on the chart.

R&B singer Thelma Aoyama's "Soba ni Iru ne" became the fastest-selling single of 2008, selling over a million copies digitally. The single was then certified by Guinness World Records as "the best selling download single in Japan". Pop singer Ayumi Hamasaki's "Mirrorcle World" debuted atop the chart, this makes Hamasaki the only female artist to have a number one single for 10 consecutive years. Technopop girl group Perfume's "Love the World" is the first technopop single to ever rank number one on the charts. Mr. Children and Greeeen are the only two artists that had an extended run on the charts.

The best-selling single overall of 2008 was pop boy band Arashi's "Truth/Kaze no Mukō e", selling a little over 618,000 copies. Arashi's "One Love" also took the place as the second-best-selling single, which sold more than 524,000 copies, followed by pop rock band Southern All Stars' "I Am Your Singer" with 520,000 copies. "Truth/Kaze no Mukō e" and "One Love" taking the Top Two spots made Arashi the fifth artist to do so. This was last achieved by Princess Princess in 1989.

Chart history

References

2008 in Japanese music
Japan Oricon
Oricon number-one singles of 2008